A hoogholtje (Dutch Low Saxon for small high wood; Dutch: hooghout; Frysian: heechholt) is a typical footbridge in the Dutch province of Groningen. In the West of the Netherlands, the same model bridge is named kwakel, kwakker, or kwakeltje. In Friesland, the bridge type is known as a heechhout.

This model bridge is high enough for small boats and low barges to pass below, as required since the 14th century. On both ends, there are usually or stairs, sometimes a ramp, to ascend or descend. While most of thes bridges are made of wood, some are of concrete or steel. The bridges are narrow, so a person can pass these with a bike, but horses with a carriage could not. Larger boats can not pass under because the structure does not move. Hence, over the years many Hoogholtjes have been replaced by larger, movable bridges. In rare cases, such bridges were built next to the pedestrian bridges and these were preserved.

Area residents would be required to maintain the bridges. Between 1900 and 1910 this responsibility transferred to the municipalities in which they were located.

One notable example is the registered monument over Baflo-Mensingeweer Canal in Baflo (Groningen). Another is the registered monument over the Frjentsjerter Feart in the eponymous Heechhout neighborhood in Waadhoeke, Friesland.

See also

Gronings dialect

References

Pedestrian bridges in the Netherlands
Wooden bridges in the Netherlands
Bridges in Groningen (province)